"God Lead Your Soul" is a song by Australian band, The Sleepy Jackson. It was released in May 2006 as the lead single from their second studio album, Personality – One Was a Spider, One Was a Bird. The song peaked at number 25 on the ARIA Charts The song was then released in the United Kingdom on 17 July 2006.

Track listings
Australian CD single: Capitol 360524 2 (EMI) [au] / EAN 0094636052427
 "God Lead Your Soul" – 3:29
 "Harmony of the Heart" – 2:11
 "Willow Tree" – 2:03
 "Rivers" – 2:21
 "Mixmatch" – 1:09

UK CD single
 "God Lead Your Soul" – 3:29
 "Got to Get Moving" – 2:11
 "(Just Like) Starting Over" (John Lennon cover) – 4:10

UK 7" #1
 Gate fold sleeve
 "God Lead Your Soul" – 3:29
 "She's Going to Be Alright" – 3:06

UK 7" #2
 White-coloured vinyl inside a fold-out poster sleeve
 "God Lead Your Soul" – 3:29
 "Ryiuchi" – 1:22

Charts

References 

The Sleepy Jackson songs
2006 songs
Songs written by Luke Steele (musician)